This is a list of people from Galați, Romania.

Florin Abelès
Eugen Aburel
Simon Achikgyozyan
Giulia Anghelescu
Esmeralda Athanasiu-Gardeev
Vera Atkins
Max Auschnitt
Camil Baciu
Adrian Bejan
Abraham Harry Blank
Cristian S. Calude
Nicolae Caranfil
Nina Cassian
Alexandru Cernat
Florin Cernat
Iordan Chimet
Ileana Cotrubaș
Ovid S. Crohmălniceanu
Dimitrie Cuclin
Nicolae Dabija
Ilan Gilon (1956–2022), Israeli politician
Valentin Gheorghiu
Ionel Jora
Sophia Karp
Gheorghe Leonida
Constantin Levaditi
Florian Luca
Radu Lupu
Virgil Madgearu
Răzvan Ochiroșii
Sybille Pantazzi
Ioan Popovici, army general
Camil Ressu
Reuven Rubin, painter
Isaac Jacob Schoenberg
Mihai Stelescu
Vasile Șeicaru
Constant Tonegaru
Victor Vâlcovici
Gheorghe Zane

 
Galati